Spring Grove High School could refer to:
Spring Grove Area High School, Spring Grove, Pennsylvania
Spring Grove High School (Minnesota), Spring Grove, Minnesota

See also
 Grove High School (disambiguation)